Maxim Borisovich Martynov (born January 15, 1973) is a Soviet and Russian engineer. He currently serves as deputy general designer and the head of the bureau at the interplanetary probe developer NPO Lavochkin. He was the chief designer of the Fobos-Grunt project at the Russian aerospace company NPO Lavochkin.

Biography 
Martynov was born on January 15, 1973, in Moscow region.

References

External links 
 Biography at Ria.ru

1973 births
Living people
Engineers from Moscow